The 2007 KBS Drama Awards is a ceremony honoring the outstanding achievement in television on the Korean Broadcasting System (KBS) network for the year of 2007. It was held on December 31, 2007 and hosted by Tak Jae-hoon and Lee Da-hae.

Nominations and winners

References

External links
http://www.kbs.co.kr/drama/2007award/redcarpet/2007index.html

KBS Drama Awards
KBS Drama Awards
KBS Drama Awards 
KBS Drama Awards